Wendelin Enders (20 October 1922 – 23 April 2019) was a German politician who served as an MP for the SPD.

References

1922 births
2019 deaths
Members of the Bundestag for Hesse
Members of the Bundestag 1983–1987
Members of the Bundestag 1980–1983
Members of the Bundestag 1976–1980
Members of the Bundestag 1972–1976
Members of the Bundestag 1969–1972
Members of the Bundestag 1965–1969
Members of the Bundestag for the Social Democratic Party of Germany